Wallmerod is a Verbandsgemeinde ("collective municipality") in the district Westerwaldkreis, in Rhineland-Palatinate, Germany. The seat of the Verbandsgemeinde is in Wallmerod.

History 
The collective municipality of Wallmerod was formed on 1 March 1972, from 15 local communities of the Oberwesterwald circle and five municipalities in the Unterwesterwaldkreis. It was thus initially in the field of two counties, which changed in 1974 when the Westerwaldkreis had been rebuilt. Wallmerod was chosen as the administrative headquarters, because of its history as the seat of a local court.

The community Hundsangen wanted to go to the neighboring federal land Hesse, which, however, failed due to the non-issuance of the appropriate authorization from Rhineland-Palatinate. This request was made at the request of citizens who do consider themselves to be the Palatinate rather than Rhinelanders.

On 1 January 1994 the municipalities Elbingen, Mähren (Westerwald) and Elbingen-Mähren were the first to become independent municipalities. The first two remained in the collective municipality.

Municipalities 
The Verbandsgemeinde Wallmerod consists of the following ortsgemeinden ("local municipalities"):

References 

Verbandsgemeinde in Rhineland-Palatinate